Roswell is a city in northern Fulton County, Georgia, United States. At the official 2010 census, the city had a population of 88,346. The 2020 estimated population was 94,884, making Roswell the state's ninth largest city. A close suburb of Atlanta, Roswell has an affluent historic district.

History

In 1830, while on a trip to northern Georgia, Roswell King passed through the area of what is now Roswell and observed the great potential for building a cotton mill along Vickery Creek. Since the land nearby was also good for plantations, he planned to put cotton processing near cotton production.

Toward the middle of the 1830s, King returned to build a mill that would soon become the largest in north Georgia – Roswell Mill. He brought with him 36 African slaves from his own coastal plantation, plus another 42 skilled carpenter slaves bought in Savannah to build the mills. The slaves built the mills, infrastructure, houses, mill worker apartments, and supporting buildings for the new town. The Africans brought their unique Geechee culture, language, and religious traditions from the coast to north Georgia.

King invited investors from the coast to join him at the new location. He was also joined by Barrington King, one of his sons, who succeeded his father in the manufacturing company. Archibald Smith was one of the planters who migrated there to establish a new plantation, also bringing enslaved African Americans from the coastal areas.

Shortly after 1832 a survey of the area  was conducted by Nathan Crawford Barnett as part of the Cherokee Purchase in preparation for the sixth state administrated land lottery culminating in the Cherokee removal.

Barrington Hall (the home of Barrington King), Smith Plantation (the home of Archibald Smith) and Bulloch Hall (the childhood home of President Theodore Roosevelt's mother, Mittie Bulloch) have been preserved and restored. They are now open to the public. According to the 1850 Slave Schedules, these three "founding families", together with the next three largest planters, held 192 slaves, 51% of the total 378 slaves held in Roswell District. Archibald Smith had a  cotton plantation. According to the 1850 Census, Barrington King held 70 slaves. Half of these slaves were under the age of 10. These slaves worked in Barrington's household. Barrington King "leased" or "rented" some of his adult male slaves to the Roswell Manufacturing Company, but they did not work around the mill machinery.

The Roswell area was part of Cobb County when first settled, and the county seat of Marietta was a four-hour (one-way) horseback ride to the west. Since Roswell residents desired a local government, they submitted a city charter for incorporation to the Georgia General Assembly. The charter was approved on February 16, 1854.

By the time of the Civil War, the cotton mills employed more than 400 people, mostly women. Given settlement patterns in the Piedmont region, they were likely of Scots-Irish descent. As the mill increased in production, so did the number of people living in the area.

During the Civil War, the city was captured by Union forces under the leadership of General Kenner Garrard. Under orders of General Sherman, Garrard shipped the mill workers north to prevent them from returning to work if the mills were rebuilt. This was a common tactic of Sherman to economically disrupt the Confederate rebellion. The mill was burned, but the houses were left standing. The ruins of the mill and the  dam that was built for power still remain. Most of the town's property was confiscated by Union forces. The leading families had left the town to go to safer places well before the Civil War, and arranged for the enslaved people to be taken away from advancing Union troops, as was often the practice. Some slaves may have escaped to freedom beyond Union lines.

After the war, Barrington King rebuilt the mills and resumed production. While many freedmen stayed in the area to work as paid labor on plantations or in town, others migrated to Fulton County and Atlanta for new opportunities. The South suffered an agricultural depression resulting from the effects of the war and the end of slavery in the United States.

According to the census, the population of Cobb County decreased slightly from 14,242 in 1860, to 13,814 in 1870. The proportion of African-Americans decreased more, from 27% to 23%. During those years, nearby Fulton County more than doubled in population, from 14,427 to 33,336. The effects of dramatic African-American migration can be seen by the increase in Fulton County from 20.5% slave in 1860 to 45.7% colored (Black) in 1870.

At the end of 1931, the United States was in the midst of the Great Depression. The difficult economic conditions drove Milton County, Roswell's neighboring county to the north (note: much of what is now Roswell was part of Milton County already), to merge in its entirety with Fulton County, Roswell's neighboring county to the south. To facilitate the merger, Roswell was ceded from Cobb County to become part of Fulton County. This became effective the 9th day of May in 1932. Roswell filed all legal records, including vital statistics, real estate, and the results of torts with the county clerk of Cobb before this date; with the county clerk of Fulton, after this date.

Lori Henry served as the first woman elected as Mayor of Roswell from 2018 to 2021.

Kurt Wilson is the current Mayor of Roswell. His term began in January 2022 and ends December 31, 2025.

Geography
Roswell is located in northern Fulton County. It is bordered to the north by Milton, to the northeast by Alpharetta, to the east by Johns Creek, to the southeast by Peachtree Corners in Gwinnett County, to the south by Sandy Springs, to the west by unincorporated land in Cobb County, and to the northwest by the city of Mountain Park and by unincorporated land in Cherokee County. The southern boundary of the city follows the Chattahoochee River.

Geographic features
Big Creek
Bull Sluice Lake
Chattahoochee River
Morgan Falls Dam
Johns Creek
Crooked Creek
Audery Mill Creek

Climate
Roswell features a Humid subtropical climate, which is characterized by abundant precipitation that is spread evenly throughout the year.

Demographics

2020 census

As of the 2020 United States census, there were 92,833 people, 35,944 households, and 25,529 families residing in the city.

2010 census
In the last official U.S. Census of 2010, Roswell had a population of 88,346. The racial and ethnic composition of the population was 74.7% White, 11.7% Black or African American, 4.0% Asian, 0.3% Native American, 0.1% Pacific Islander, 6.6% from some other race and 2.5% from two or more races. 16.6% of the population was Hispanic or Latino of any race; a majority of them were of Mexican origin (11.5% of the total population).

2000 census
In the preceding census of 2000, there were 79,334 people, 30,207 households, and 20,933 families residing in the city. The racial makeup of the city was 81.51% White, 8.54% African American, 0.20% Native American, 3.74% Asian, 0.03% Pacific Islander, 4.08% from other races, and 1.90% from two or more races. Hispanic or Latino of any race were 10.61% of the population.

There were 30,207 households, out of which 34.6% had children under the age of 18 living with them, 57.1% were married couples living together, 8.6% had a female householder with no husband present, and 30.7% were non-families. 23.1% of all households were made up of individuals, and 4.5% had someone living alone who was 65 years of age or older.  The average household size was 2.61 and the average family size was 3.07.

In the city, the population was spread out, with 24.4% under the age of 18, 8.2% from 18 to 24, 35.1% from 25 to 44, 24.7% from 45 to 64, and 7.5% who were 65 years of age or older. The median age was 37.2 years. For every 100 females, there were 100.0 males. For every 100 females age 18 and over, there were 98.0 males.

According to a 2007 estimate, the median income for a household in the city was $73,469, and the median income for a family was $103,698. The average income for households was $106,219 and the average income for families was $123,481. Males had a median income of $72,754 versus $45,979 for females. The per capita income for the city was $40,106. About 3.2% of families and 5.0% of the population were below the poverty line, including 5.6% of those under age 18 and 0.7% of those age 65 or over.

Household income (2010)

Household income (2010)

Roswell median housing value

2000 population by age

Population by gender (2006)

Education

Race and ethnicity

Economy
The Consulate-General of Honduras in Atlanta is located at Suite 3 in 600 Houze Way in Roswell. The city's largest employers are The Kimberly Clark Corporation, Wellstar North Fulton Hospital, Harry's Farmers Market, and The City Of Roswell. A section of Route 400 between Roswell and Atlanta is known as the high tech corridor, where many technology firms like Kimberly Clark have factories or offices. As of the 2006 census, one third of Roswell's 5.000 registered business were home based. The largest industries were retail, technology, food services, wholesale trade and health care.

Many Roswell residents work in nearby Atlanta.

Businesses with their headquarters in Roswell include Snorg Tees, Tripwire Interactive, and Pharsalia Technologies. Roswell's economy is large enough to recruit franchises from many popular Georgia businesses like Moe's Southwest Grill, Chick-fil-A and Heel Sew Quik operate multiple locations in Roswell.

Arts and culture

Festivals and parades
Roswell Memorial Day Ceremony — the largest Memorial Day Ceremony in Georgia
Roswell Roots: A Festival of Black History & Culture (February)
Roswell Criterium Bicycle Race and Historic Roswell Kiwanis Kids Bike Safety Rodeo (May)
Roswell Magnolia Storytelling Festival (June)
Riverside Sounds Concert Series (May — October)
Roswell Youth Day Parade and Festival (October)
Keep Roswell Beautiful Duck Race (October)
Roswell Annual Fireworks Extravaganza July 4
Roswell Wine Festival (first Sunday in October - Sunday, October 4, 2015)
Alive in Roswell (third Thursday of the month, April-October)

Sites
Historic Roswell Visitors Center
Archibald Smith Plantation Home
Bulloch Hall
Barrington Hall
Chattahoochee River National Recreation Area
Chattahoochee Nature Center
Computer Museum of America
Faces Of War Memorial
Primrose Cottage
Teaching Museum North
Atlanta Rowing Club
Roswell Mill

Public libraries
Atlanta-Fulton Public Library System operates the Roswell Branch and the East Roswell Branch.

Sports
The Chess Club and Scholastic Center of Atlanta, founded by GM Ben Finegold, is located in Roswell.

Parks and recreation

A branch of the Chattahoochee River National Recreation Area, a component of the National Park System, is located in Roswell at Vickery Creek.

Education

Public schools
Roswell's local public schools are part of the Fulton County School System.

Charter schools
Amana Academy (K–8)
Fulton County Charter High School of Mathematics and Science (disbanded)
Fulton Academy of Science and Technology (K-8)

Elementary schools
Esther Jackson Elementary School
Hembree Springs Elementary School
Mimosa Elementary School
Mountain Park Elementary School
Northwood Elementary School
Roswell North Elementary School
Sweet Apple Elementary School
Hillside Elementary School
River Eves Elementary School
Vickery Mill Elementary School

Middle schools
Crabapple Middle School
Elkins Pointe Middle School
Holcomb Bridge Middle School

High schools

Centennial High School
Crossroads Second Chance North Alternative School
Roswell High School

Private schools
Blessed Trinity Catholic High School
Cottage School
Queen of Angels Catholic School
The Howard School (North Campus)
Jacob's Ladder Neurodevelopmental School & Therapy Center (Roswell Campus).
Regina Caeli Academy
Fellowship Christian School
Atlanta Academy 
Eaton Academy
Saint Francis Schools

Infrastructure

Transportation

Major roads and expressways
 State Route 9
 State Route 92
 State Route 120
 State Route 140
 State Route 400
Pine Grove Road
Riverside Road
Crabapple Road

Pedestrians and cycling
Big Creek Greenway
PATH400 (proposed)
 Roswell Riverwalk Trail
 Vickery Creek Trail

Notable people

Jerome Bettis, former Pittsburgh Steeler and current NBC Sports announcer.
Peter Buck, musician, attended Crestwood High School
Jay Busbee, author/journalist, resides in Roswell.
David Cross, comedian, television, and film actor, writer, and director, lived in Roswell as a child.
Deko, born Grant Andrew Decouto in Roswell, rapper and Grammy-nominated music producer.
Emily Dolvin, aunt of Jimmy Carter (the 39th US president), lived in Roswell the majority of her life
Ben Finegold, chess grandmaster, founded the Chess Club and Scholastic Center of Atlanta (CCSCATL) in Roswell.
Anya Monzikova, Russian-American actress and model, currently lives in Roswell with her husband.
Brendan Moore, professional soccer player
Jeff Foxworthy (born 1958), stand-up comedian, actor, television/radio personality, author, and voice artist
Karen Handel, former Georgia Secretary of State, and former US Representative of the 6th congressional district of Georgia resides in Roswell.
Landon Milbourne, basketball player for Hapoel Eilat of the Israeli Basketball Premier League
Pauley Perrette, writer, singer, civil rights advocate and former actress, attended Crestwood High School
Jermaine Phillips (born 1979), nephew of Tony Phillips, was an American football safety in the NFL for the Tampa Bay Buccaneers from 2002 to 2009.
Tony Phillips, baseball utility player who had an 18-year Major League Baseball (MLB) career from 1982 to 1999. 
Dale Murphy, two-time National League MVP, former Atlanta Braves MLB player, lived in Roswell in the 1980s.
In 2006, Tom Price was re-elected to a second term in the US House of Representatives to serve as the Congressman from the 6th congressional district of Georgia, the district that encompasses most of Roswell. Price later served as the US Secretary of Health and Human Services under the administration of Donald Trump.
Mike Ramsey, former Roswell High baseball star, went on to play for the NL's St. Lous Cardinals (MLB) from 1978 until 1985. Also played on the World Series Champion Cardnals in 1982.
Architect Neel Reid lived in Mimosa Hall and died there in 1926.
Chris Reis, Super Bowl 44 champion (New Orleans Saints), Roswell High graduate.
Martha Bulloch Roosevelt,  mother of Theodore Roosevelt (26th US President) and grandmother of Eleanor Roosevelt, came from Roswell. Bulloch Hall was her home.
Nap Rucker, left-handed pitcher in MLB for the Brooklyn Superbas/Dodgers/Robins
 Sam Sloman (born 1997), NFL football player
Amin Stevens (born 1990), basketball player in the Israeli Basketball Premier League
 Sunny Suljic (born 2005), actor

Further reading
 Sherron D. Lawson, A Guide to the Historic Textile Mill Town of Roswell, Georgia (Roswell, Ga.: Roswell Historical Society, 1996).
 
 Galloway, Tammy Harden, ed. 2003. Dear Old Roswell: Civil War Letters of the King Family of Roswell, Georgia. Macon, GA: Mercer University Press.

References

External links

 City of Roswell official website

 
Cities in Georgia (U.S. state)
Cities in Fulton County, Georgia
Populated places established in 1854
Cities in the Atlanta metropolitan area
1854 establishments in Georgia (U.S. state)